Tim Lobinger (3 September 1972 – 16 February 2023) was a German pole vaulter.

Career 
Lobinger's discipline was pole vault and he was an elite competitor from the 1990s. His best results came in 1997 and 1999 when he jumped over 6.00 meters. His best medals were silver at the 1998 European Athletics Championships and the 2006 European Athletics Championships. He won bronze at the 2002 European Championships in Athletics and the 2006 IAAF World Indoor Championships.

Success eluded him at the Olympics however. In Atlanta in 1996 he placed seventh. In Sydney in 2000 he achieved 13th, and in Athens in 2004, eleventh. At the 2005 World Championships in Helsinki he jumped over only 5.50 meters, well under his abilities.

Lobinger completed a decathlon in 1999 and cleared 5.76 m in the pole vault – a decathlon best for the ten-event contest.

Personal life and death 
Lobinger was married to triple jumper Petra Lobinger (née Laux) from 1994 to 2003. He was the father of two children with her, Fee (born 1995) and Tyger (born 1999), the latter of which plays as a professional footballer. He had another son, born in 2016, with Alina Lobinger (née Baumann) from whom he separated in 2017.

Lobinger died from cancer on 16 February 2023, at the age of 50.

Achievements

See also
 Germany all-time top lists – Pole vault

References

External links 

 
 

1972 births
2023 deaths
Deaths from cancer in Germany
Deaths from leukemia
People from Rheinbach
Sportspeople from Cologne (region)
German male pole vaulters
German national athletics champions
Athletes (track and field) at the 1996 Summer Olympics
Athletes (track and field) at the 2000 Summer Olympics
Athletes (track and field) at the 2004 Summer Olympics
Athletes (track and field) at the 2008 Summer Olympics
Olympic athletes of Germany
European Athletics Championships medalists
World Athletics Indoor Championships winners